10 Gigabit Ethernet (10GE, 10GbE, or 10 GigE) is a group of computer networking technologies for transmitting Ethernet frames at a rate of 10 gigabits per second. It was first defined by the IEEE 802.3ae-2002 standard. Unlike previous Ethernet standards, 10 Gigabit Ethernet defines only full-duplex point-to-point links which are generally connected by network switches; shared-medium CSMA/CD operation has not been carried over from the previous generations Ethernet standards so half-duplex operation and repeater hubs do not exist in 10GbE.

The 10 Gigabit Ethernet standard encompasses a number of different physical layer (PHY) standards. A networking device, such as a switch or a network interface controller may have different PHY types through pluggable PHY modules, such as those based on SFP+. Like previous versions of Ethernet, 10GbE can use either copper or fiber cabling.  Maximum distance over copper cable is 100 meters but because of its bandwidth requirements, higher-grade cables are required.

The adoption of 10 Gigabit Ethernet has been more gradual than previous revisions of Ethernet: in 2007, one million 10GbE ports were shipped, in 2009 two million ports were shipped, and in 2010 over three million ports were shipped, with an estimated nine million ports in 2011. , although the price per gigabit of bandwidth for 10 Gigabit Ethernet was about one-third compared to Gigabit Ethernet, the price per port of 10 Gigabit Ethernet still hindered more widespread adoption.

Standards
Over the years the Institute of Electrical and Electronics Engineers (IEEE) 802.3 working group has published several standards relating to 10GbE.

Physical layer modules

To implement different 10GbE physical layer standards, many interfaces consist of a standard socket into which different physical (PHY) layer modules may be plugged. PHY modules are not specified in an official standards body but by multi-source agreements (MSAs) that can be negotiated more quickly. Relevant MSAs for 10GbE include XENPAK (and related X2 and XPAK), XFP and SFP+. When choosing a PHY module, a designer considers cost, reach, media type, power consumption, and size (form factor).  A single point-to-point link can have different MSA pluggable formats on either end (e.g. XPAK and SFP+) as long as the 10GbE optical or copper port type (e.g. 10GBASE-SR) supported by the pluggable is identical.

XENPAK was the first MSA for 10GE and had the largest form factor. X2 and XPAK were later competing standards with smaller form factors. X2 and XPAK have not been as successful in the market as XENPAK. XFP came after X2 and XPAK and it is also smaller.

The newest module standard is the enhanced small form-factor pluggable transceiver, generally called SFP+. Based on the small form-factor pluggable transceiver (SFP) and developed by the ANSI T11 fibre channel group, it is smaller still and lower power than XFP. SFP+ has become the most popular socket on 10GE systems. SFP+ modules do only optical to electrical conversion, no clock and data recovery, putting a higher burden on the host's channel equalization.  SFP+ modules share a common physical form factor with legacy SFP modules, allowing higher port density than XFP and the re-use of existing designs for 24 or 48 ports in a 19-inch rack width blade.

Optical modules are connected to a host by either a XAUI, XFI or SerDes Framer Interface (SFI) interface. XENPAK, X2, and XPAK modules use XAUI to connect to their hosts. XAUI (XGXS) uses a four-lane data channel and is specified in IEEE 802.3 Clause 47. XFP modules use a XFI interface and SFP+ modules use an SFI interface. XFI and SFI use a single lane data channel and the 64b/66b encoding specified in IEEE 802.3 Clause 49.

SFP+ modules can further be grouped into two types of host interfaces: linear or limiting. Limiting modules are preferred except when for long-reach applications using 10GBASE-LRM modules.

Optical fiber

There are two basic types of optical fiber used for 10 Gigabit Ethernet: single-mode (SMF) and multi-mode (MMF).  In SMF light follows a single path through the fiber while in MMF it takes multiple paths resulting in differential mode delay (DMD). SMF is used for long-distance communication and MMF is used for distances of less than 300 m. SMF has a narrower core (8.3 μm) which requires a more precise termination and connection method. MMF has a wider core (50 or 62.5 μm). The advantage of MMF is that it can be driven by a low cost Vertical-cavity surface-emitting laser (VCSEL) for short distances, and multi-mode connectors are cheaper and easier to terminate reliably in the field. The advantage of SMF is that it can work over longer distances.

In the 802.3 standard, reference is made to FDDI-grade MMF fiber. This has a 62.5 μm core and a minimum modal bandwidth of 160 MHz·km at 850 nm. It was originally installed in the early 1990s for FDDI and 100BASE-FX networks. The 802.3 standard also references ISO/IEC 11801 which specifies optical MMF fiber types OM1, OM2, OM3 and OM4. OM1 has a 62.5 μm core while the others have a 50 μm core. At 850 nm the minimum modal bandwidth of OM1 is 200 MHz·km, of OM2 500 MHz·km, of OM3 2000 MHz·km and of OM4 4700 MHz·km. FDDI-grade cable is now obsolete and new structured cabling installations use either OM3 or OM4 cabling. OM3 cable can carry 10 Gigabit Ethernet 300 meters using low cost 10GBASE-SR optics. OM4 can manage 400 meters.

To distinguish SMF from MMF cables, SMF cables are usually yellow, while MMF cables are orange (OM1 & OM2) or aqua (OM3 & OM4). However, in fiber optics there is no uniform color for any specific optical speed or technology with the exception being angular physical connector (APC), it being an agreed color of green.

There are also active optical cables (AOC). These have the optical electronics already connected eliminating the connectors between the cable and the optical module. They plug into standard SFP+ sockets. They are lower cost than other optical solutions because the manufacturer can match the electronics to the required length and type of cable.

10GBASE-SR

10GBASE-SR ("short range") is a port type for multi-mode fiber and uses 850 nm lasers. Its Physical Coding Sublayer (PCS) is 64b/66b and is defined in IEEE 802.3 Clause 49 and its Physical Medium Dependent (PMD) sublayer in Clause 52. It delivers serialized data at a line rate of 10.3125 Gbd.

The range depends on the type of multi-mode fiber used.

MMF has the advantage over SMF of having lower cost connectors; its wider core requires less mechanical precision.

The 10GBASE-SR transmitter is implemented with a VCSEL which is low cost and low power. OM3 and OM4 optical cabling is sometimes described as laser optimized because they have been designed to work with VCSELs. 10GBASE-SR delivers the lowest cost, lowest power and smallest form factor optical modules.

There is a lower cost, lower power variant sometimes referred to as 10GBASE-SRL (10GBASE-SR lite). This is inter-operable with 10GBASE-SR but only has a reach of 100 meters.

10GBASE-LR
10GBASE-LR (long reach) is a port type for single-mode fiber and uses 1310 nm lasers. Its 64b/66b PCS is defined in IEEE 802.3 Clause 49 and its PMD sublayer in Clause 52. It delivers serialized data at a line rate of 10.3125 GBd.

The 10GBASE-LR transmitter is implemented with a Fabry–Pérot or Distributed feedback laser (DFB). DFB lasers are more expensive than VCSELs but their high power and longer wavelength allow efficient coupling into the small core of single-mode fiber over greater distances.

10GBASE-LR maximum fiber length is 10 kilometers, although this will vary depending on the type of single-mode fiber used.

10GBASE-LRM
10GBASE-LRM, (long reach multi-mode) originally specified in IEEE 802.3aq is a port type for multi-mode fiber and uses 1310 nm lasers. Its 64b/66b PCS is defined in IEEE 802.3 Clause 49 and its PMD sublayer in Clause 68. It delivers serialized data at a line rate of 10.3125 GBd. 10GBASE-LRM uses electronic dispersion compensation (EDC) for receive equalization.

To ensure that specifications are met over FDDI-grade, OM1 and OM2 fibers, the transmitter should be coupled through a mode conditioning patch cord. No mode conditioning patch cord is required for applications over OM3 or OM4.

10GBASE-ER
10GBASE-ER (extended reach) is a port type for single-mode fiber and uses 1550 nm lasers. Its 64b/66b PCS is defined in IEEE 802.3 Clause 49 and its PMD sublayer in Clause 52. It delivers serialized data at a line rate of 10.3125 GBd.

The 10GBASE-ER transmitter is implemented with an externally modulated laser (EML).

10GBASE-ZR
Several manufacturers have introduced  range under the name 10GBASE-ZR. This 80 km PHY is not specified within the IEEE 802.3ae standard and manufacturers have created their own specifications based upon the 80 km PHY described in the OC-192/STM-64 SDH/SONET specifications.

10GBASE-LX4
10GBASE-LX4 is a port type for multi-mode fiber and single-mode fiber. It uses four separate laser sources operating at 3.125 Gbit/s and Coarse wavelength-division multiplexing with four unique wavelengths around 1310 nm. Its 8b/10b PCS is defined in IEEE 802.3 Clause 48 and its Physical Medium Dependent (PMD) sublayer in Clause 53.

It can reach  over FDDI-grade, OM1, OM2 and OM3 multi-mode cabling. In this case, it needs to be coupled through a SMF offset-launch mode-conditioning patch cord.

10GBASE-PR

10GBASE-PR originally specified in IEEE 802.3av is a 10 Gigabit Ethernet PHY for passive optical networks and uses 1577 nm lasers in the downstream direction and 1270 nm lasers in the upstream direction. Its PMD sublayer is specified in Clause 75. Downstream delivers serialized data at a line rate of 10.3125 Gbit/s in a point to multi-point configuration.

10GBASE-PR has three power budgets specified as 10GBASE-PR10, 10GBASE-PR20 and 10GBASE-PR30.

10GBASE-BR 
Multiple vendors introduced single strand, bi-directional 10 Gbit/s optics capable of a single-mode fiber connection functionally equivalent to 10GBASE-LR or -ER, but using a single strand of fiber optic cable. Analogous to 1000BASE-BX10, this is accomplished using a passive prism inside each optical transceiver and a matched pair of transceivers using two different wavelengths such as 1270 and 1330 nm. Modules are available in varying transmit powers and reach distances ranging from 10 to 80 km.

These advances were subsequently standardized in IEEE 802.3cp-2021 with reaches of 10, 20, or 40 km.

Copper
10 Gigabit Ethernet can also run over twin-axial cabling, twisted pair cabling, and backplanes.

10GBASE-CX4

10GBASE-CX4 was the first 10 Gigabit copper standard published by 802.3 (as 802.3ak-2004). It uses the XAUI 4-lane PCS (Clause 48) and copper cabling similar to that used by InfiniBand technology with the same SFF-8470 connectors. Each lane carries 3.125 GBd of signaling bandwidth.

10GBASE-CX4 has been used for stacking switches. It offers the advantages of low power, low cost and low latency, but has a bigger form factor and more bulky cables than the newer single-lane SFP+ standard, and a much shorter reach than fiber or 10GBASE-T.  This cable is fairly rigid and considerably more costly than Category 5/6 UTP or fiber.

SFP+ direct attach
Also known as direct attach (DA), direct attach copper (DAC), 10GSFP+Cu, 10GBASE-CR  or 10GBASE-CX1. Short direct attach cables use a passive twinaxial cabling assembly while longer ones, sometimes called active optical cable (AOC) use short wavelength optics. Both types connect directly into an SFP+ housing. SFP+ direct attach has a fixed-length cable, up to 15 m for copper cables, or up to 100 m in for AOC. Like 10GBASE-CX4, DA is low-power, low-cost and low-latency with the added advantages of using less bulky cables and of having the small SFP+ form factor. SFP+ direct attach today is tremendously popular, with more ports installed than 10GBASE-SR.

Backplane
The standard defines two port types for 10 Gbit/s (10GBASE-KX4 and 10GBASE-KR) and a single 1 Gbit/s port type (1000BASE-KX). It also defines an optional layer for forward error correction, a backplane autonegotiation protocol and link training for 10GBASE-KR where the receiver tunes a three-tap transmit equalizer. The autonegotiation protocol selects between 1000BASE-KX, 10GBASE-KX4, 10GBASE-KR or 40GBASE-KR4 operation.

10GBASE-KX4
This operates over four backplane lanes and uses the same physical layer coding (defined in IEEE 802.3 Clause 48) as 10GBASE-CX4.

10GBASE-KR
This operates over a single backplane lane and uses the same physical layer coding (defined in IEEE 802.3 Clause 49) as 10GBASE-LR/ER/SR. New backplane designs use 10GBASE-KR rather than 10GBASE-KX4.

10GBASE-T

Category 6A is required to reach the full distance and category 5e or 6 may reach up to  depending on the quality of installation. 10GBASE-T cable infrastructure can also be used for 1000BASE-T allowing a gradual upgrade from 1000BASE-T using autonegotiation to select which speed is used. Due to additional line coding overhead, 10GBASE-T has a slightly higher latency (2 to 4 microseconds) in comparison to most other 10GBASE variants (1 microsecond or less). In comparison, 1000BASE-T latency is 1 to 12 microseconds (depending on packet size).

10GBASE-T uses the IEC 60603-7 8P8C modular connectors already widely used with Ethernet. To reach this frequency Category 6A or better balanced twisted pair cables specified in ISO/IEC 11801 amendment 2 or ANSI/TIA-568-C.2 are needed to carry 10GBASE-T up to distances of 100 m. Category 6 cables can carry 10GBASE-T for shorter distances when qualified according to the guidelines in ISO TR 24750 or TIA-155-A.

The 802.3an standard specifies the wire-level modulation for 10GBASE-T to use Tomlinson-Harashima precoding (THP) and pulse-amplitude modulation with 16 discrete levels (PAM-16), encoded in a two-dimensional checkerboard pattern known as DSQ128 sent on the line at 800 Msymbols/sec. Prior to precoding, forward error correction (FEC) coding is performed using a [2048,1723]2 low-density parity-check code on 1723 bits, with the parity check matrix construction based on a generalized Reed–Solomon [32,2,31] code over GF(26). Another 1536 bits are uncoded. Within each 1723+1536 block, there are 1+50+8+1 signaling and error detection bits and 3200 data bits (and occupy 320 ns on the line). In contrast, PAM-5 is the modulation technique used in 1000BASE-T Gigabit Ethernet.

The line encoding used by 10GBASE-T is the basis for the newer and slower 2.5GBASE-T and 5GBASE-T standard, implementing a 2.5 or 5.0 Gbit/s connection over existing category 5e or 6 cabling. Cables that will not function reliably with 10GBASE-T may successfully operate with 2.5GBASE-T or 5GBASE-T if supported by both ends.

10GBASE-T1
10GBASE-T1 is for automotive applications and operates over a single balanced pair of conductors up to 15 m long, and is standardized in 802.3ch-2020.

WAN PHY (10GBASE-W)
At the time that the 10 Gigabit Ethernet standard was developed, interest in 10GbE as a wide area network (WAN) transport led to the introduction of a WAN PHY for 10GbE. The WAN PHY was designed to interoperate with OC-192/STM-64 SDH/SONET equipment using a light-weight SDH/SONET frame running at 9.953 Gbit/s. The WAN PHY operates at a slightly slower data-rate than the local area network (LAN) PHY. The WAN PHY can drive maximum link distances up to 80 km depending on the fiber standard employed.

The WAN PHY uses the same 10GBASE-S, 10GBASE-L and 10GBASE-E optical PMDs as the LAN PHYs and is designated as 10GBASE-SW, 10GBASE-LW or 10GBASE-EW. Its 64b/66b PCS is defined in IEEE 802.3 clause 49 and its PMD sublayers in clause 52. It also uses a WAN interface sublayer (WIS) defined in clause 50 which adds extra encapsulation to format the frame data to be compatible with SONET STS-192c.

Notes

See also

 GG45
 List of interface bit rates
 Optical communication
 Optical fiber cable
 Parallel optical interface
 TERA
 XAUI

References

External links
 Ethernet Alliance website
 World's First Independent 10GBASE-T Comparative Test Study

Ethernet standards